Mariusz Fyrstenberg and Marcin Matkowski were the defending champions, but lost to David Marrero and Fernando Verdasco in the quarterfinals.
Alexander Peya and Bruno Soares won the tournament, defeating Robert Lindstedt and Daniel Nestor in the final, 5–7, 7–6(9–7), [10–4].

Seeds

Draw

Draw

References
 Main Draw

Barcelona Open Banco Sabadell - Doubles